Kokumin Minshutō (国民民主党) may refer to:
National Democratic Party (Japan), 1950-1952
Democratic Party for the People, 2018-

ja:国民民主党